Peter Duncan (born 8 September 1964) is an Australian film director and screenwriter. His 1999 film Passion was entered into the 21st Moscow International Film Festival.

Selected filmography
 Children of the Revolution (1996)
 A Little Bit of Soul (1998)
 Passion (1999)
 Hell Has Harbour Views (2005)
 Unfinished Sky (2007)
 Rake (2010-2018) Australian TV series
  Operation Buffalo (2020) Australian TV mini-series

References

External links

1964 births
Living people
Australian film directors
Australian screenwriters
People from Sydney